Rossend Nobas i Ballbé was a Catalan sculptor and goldsmith in the 19th century. Working mainly in Barcelona, Nobas's work is to be found around the city in both museums and public areas.

Biography 
Nobas was born in 1849. His father was a tinsmith. In working with his father, he was introduced to metallurgy techniques when he was quite young. This training brought him into contact with the Maseria family, a connection he would maintain for his entire career.

This school was dedicated to teaching art. There Nobas learned sculpture through studying great sculptors of the past. He eventually entered the workshop of the Vallmitjana brothers. After being with them and perfecting his technique, he created his own studio.

He exhibited in the Paris Salon of 1866. In 1871, at the National Exhibition of Fine Arts in Madrid, Nobas received a second-class medal for his work the Wounded Bullfighter. His Bust of Cervantes gained an award at the World Exhibition in Vienna in 1873.

He died unexpectedly of pneumonia in 1891.

Style 
While Nobas also trained in oil painting and watercolors, as was part of the typical Art Education, he specialized in sculpture. His work spans large, monumental pieces, to bust portraiture.  Nobas followed the naturalism and realism schools. In an era before photography, naturalistic art represented the subject realistically. His work was characterized by his exceptional talent as a sculptor. His rendering of fine details, like lace, is unparalleled.

List of art works

References

Further reading 
 DDAA. La col·lecció Raimon Casellas. Publicacions del MNAC/ Museo del Prado, 1992. . 
 DDAA, La Gran Enciclopèdia en català. Volum 14, (2004), Barcelona, Edicions 62. 
 SUBIRACHS i BURGAYA, Judit. L'Abadia de Montserrat. L'escultura del segle XIX a Catalunya: del romanticisme al realisme. Volum 146 de Biblioteca Abat Oliba, 1994. .

External links 

 Museu Nacional d'Art de Catalunya
 Grand Catalan Encyclopedia

1840s births
1891 deaths
Burials at Poblenou Cemetery